Edward Watson, 2nd Baron Rockingham (30 June 1630 – 22 June 1689) was an English landowner and peer. He was the only surviving son of Lewis Watson, 1st Baron Rockingham (1584 – 1653) of Rockingham Castle and his second wife, Eleanor Manners (1629 – 1696), daughter of Sir George Manners, of Haddon Hall, Derbyshire and Grace Pierrepont, daughter of Sir Henry Pierrepont. 

A Whig in politics, he took his seat in the House of Lords in June 1660. He was Keeper of Corby Woods, Rockingham Forest in 1660. His claims, as owner of the manor of Little Weldon, to do service as Master of the Buckhounds at the coronation of Charles II, and at that of James II, were not allowed.

He married, on 13 November 1654 at St. Giles’s-in-the-Fields, Anne Wentworth (1629 – 1696), daughter of Thomas Wentworth, 1st Earl of Strafford (1593 – 1641) and Arabella Holles (d. 1631), daughter of John Holles, 1st Earl of Clare. They had four sons and four daughters:
Lewis Watson, 1st Earl of Rockingham married Catherine Sondes (d. 1696), daughter of George Sondes, 1st Earl of Feversham.
Edward Watson (4 February 1657 – 2 February 1676).
Thomas Watson (17 June 1665 – 6 October 1723) married Anne Proby, daughter of Sir Thomas Proby of Elton Hall.
George Watson (b. 26 December 1669) died unmarried. 
Eleanor Watson (b. 26 February 1659) married, 23 October 1679, Thomas Leigh, 2nd Baron Leigh (1652 – 1710) of Stoneleigh, Warwickshire.
Arabella Watson (18 March 1661 – 1734) married Sir Thomas Oxenden.
Anne Watson (b. 4 February 1663) died unmarried. 
Margaret Watson (22 November 1667 – 3 February 1714).

He died 22 June and was buried 26 June 1689 at Rockingham. He was succeeded in the Barony by his son, Lewis, later created Earl of Rockingham. His widow died 2 January and was buried with her husband at Rockingham 8 January 1696.

References

Sources

External links
Rockingham Castle

1630 births
1689 deaths
Barons in the Peerage of England
Whig (British political party) MPs